The Phantom Horseman may refer to:

 The Phantom Horseman (1924 film), American film
 The Phantom Horseman (1990 film), Australian film